Andrés Eugenio Rillón Romani (27 December 1929 – 5 January 2017) was a Chilean lawyer, actor, film director, and comedian.

Lawyer and director of the Electoral Registry
Andrés Rillón studied law at several universities, graduating from the University of Chile. In 1963, age 33, he obtained a law degree.

He was director of his country's Electoral Registry (predecessor of the ) from 1965 to 1977, acting in an interim capacity from 1965 to 1968. During his term of office, a constitutional reform was implemented granting suffrage to men and women over 18 years old, regardless of literacy, and modernizing the service through the implementation of computer technologies of the time. He was asked to resign in 1977, during the military regime, after having refused to be director of a government publication.

Artistic career
Rillón studied film at the Pontifical Catholic University of Chile. He served as an actor, film producer and theater director.

He also starred in a series of commercials for Cecinas Winter from 1987 to 1997. In cinema, he starred in the films  (2006) and Héroes: el asilo contra la opresión (2014).

He was also a television critic for ten years (1976–1986) for El Mercurio, and a comedic columnist in the magazine Qué Pasa (1972–1973) and the evening newspaper La Segunda. He wrote under the pseudonyms "Argos", "Artos", and "Aramis".

Personal life and health
On 8 December 1957, he married María Elvira Reyes, with whom he had six children.

During his final years, he suffered heart problems. In December 2016, he was admitted to the hospital for a week, and the need for a surgical intervention was evaluated. In an interview with Las Últimas Noticias, Rillón affirmed with his peculiar sense of humor that, "they have to operate on me if funerary festivities do not go ahead." On 5 January 2017, Rillón died at age 87. He was buried in Santiago's Parque del Recuerdo.

Filmography

Film

TV series

Publications
 Cosas que podrían interesar a más de alguien: una autobiografía (2008)

References

External links
 

1929 births
2017 deaths
20th-century Chilean lawyers
20th-century Chilean male actors
21st-century Chilean male actors
Chilean male comedians
Chilean male film actors
Chilean male television actors
Chilean people of Italian descent
People from Viña del Mar
Pontifical Catholic University of Chile alumni
University of Chile alumni